The Americus micropolitan statistical area, as defined by the United States Census Bureau, is an area consisting of two counties in Georgia, anchored by the city of Americus.

At the 2000 census, the μSA had a population of 36,966 (though a July 1, 2009, estimate placed the population at 36,409).

Counties
Schley
Sumter

Communities
Incorporated places
Americus (principal city)
Andersonville
De Soto
Ellaville
Leslie
Plains
Unincorporated places
Cobb
Murrays Crossroads

Demographics
At the 2000 census,  36,966 people, 13,460 households and 9,542 families wereresiding within the μSA. The racial makeup of the area was 50.01% White, 47.22% African American, 0.29% Native American, 0.54% Asian, 1.3o% from other races, and 0.64% from two or more races. Hispanics or Latinos of any race were 2.65% of the population.

The median household income was $31,470 and the median family income was $35,797. Males had a median income of $28,534 versus $20,196 for females. The per capita income was $15,032.

See also

Georgia census statistical areas

References

 
Geography of Sumter County, Georgia
Geography of Schley County, Georgia